Carroll High School is a school in Fort Wayne, Indiana, United States. It is part of the Northwest Allen County Schools and is accredited by the North Central Association.

History

Indiana school reorganization
The Indiana General Assembly passed the Indiana School Reorganization Act of 1959, which required school districts with fewer than 2,000 students to consolidate with nearby districts. This resulted in the three Allen County townships of Lake, Eel River and Perry combining into Northwest Allen County Schools (NACS). At that time, high schools existed in Arcola and Huntertown. The NACS school board voted to combine the two high schools in 1967 into a single newly built school south of Huntertown. The new high school, which opened in 1969, was named after Carroll Road, a rural arterial road that connects U.S. Route 33 and State Road 3 in northern Allen County.

Farmland to suburban boom
Booming enrollment from the suburban sprawl of nearby Fort Wayne into Perry Township caused NACS to build Carroll Middle School (CMS) adjacent to the main high school in 1984. By the fall of 2004 as enrollment continued to increase, the school district built other middle schools (including a new Carroll Middle School), and the old CMS was absorbed into Carroll High School as its "freshman campus."

General information
The school opened in 1969 and constructed additions to the facility in 1992 and 1996. A freshman campus was created in 2005.

Athletics
The Carroll High School Chargers compete in the Summit Athletic Conference (SAC). Carroll was previously a member of the Northeast Eight Conference, but joined the SAC in 2015. Carroll’s biggest rival is with the crosstown Spartans of Homestead High School.  The following Indiana High School Athletic Association (IHSAA) sports are offered:

Baseball (boys)
State champion - 2010, 2011
Basketball (girls and boys)
Cross country (girls and boys)
Boys state champion - 2016
Girls state champion - 2018, 2019
Football (boys)
Golf (girls and boys)
Gymnastics (girls)
Soccer (girls and boys)
Softball (girls)
Swimming and diving (girls and boys)
Tennis (girls and boys)
Track and field Girls and boys)
Unified flag football (coed)
Unified track and field (coed)
Volleyball (girls)
Wrestling (boys)

Notable alumni
Justin Busch, Indiana State Senator, 16th District 
Jon Fitch, professional mixed martial artist, formerly with the UFC
Drue Tranquill, NFL Linebacker, Los Angeles Chargers

See also
 List of high schools in Indiana

References

External links
Carroll High School
Northwest Allen County Schools

Public high schools in Indiana
Schools in Fort Wayne, Indiana
Educational institutions established in 1969
1969 establishments in Indiana